Behind the Headlines is a 1937 American drama film directed by Richard Rosson from a screenplay by Edmund Hartmann and J. Robert Bren, based on an original story by Thomas Ahearn. It was produced and distributed by RKO Radio Pictures, who released the film on May 14, 1937. The film stars Lee Tracy and Diana Gibson, with a supporting cast which includes Donald Meek, Paul Guilfoyle, Philip Huston and Frank M. Thomas.

Plot
Eddie Haines (Lee Tracy) is a big-city radio reporter, known for his on-the-scene reporting. He does it with a backpack radio and lapel microphone. His associate, Tiny (Tom Kennedy), relays Haines' reports to the station with a radio-equipped car. Haines is romantically involved with a reporter for the Star newspaper, Mary Bradley (Diana Gibson), whom he constantly scoops. Frustrated by this, Mary steals the pack radio and hides it in her car.

Haines leaves his jacket with the microphone in a room where  gangster Art Martin (Paul Guilfoyle) and his crew are planning to rob a government gold shipment to the United States Bullion Depository at Fort Knox. Haines and Tiny overhear their plan, but so does Mary, eavesdropping on them. She goes to phone the Star with the story, but first encounters Potter (Donald Meek), a Federal officer she had met before.

Potter tells her that the Feds are onto the plot, and to kill her story. He offers in return to bring her along on the operation, and they drive to Louisville in her car. There he turns her over to Martin and his gang: Potter is actually the mastermind of the plot. Haines and Tiny had tried to follow Martin from the meeting, but he evaded them.

The gang successfully ambush and capture the armored truck carrying the gold, with Potter and Mary looking on from her car; then all of them drive to Potter's cave hide-out. During the ambush, Mary secretly drops her inscribed watch (a gift from Haines) on the roadside.

Back east, Mary's editor thinks Haines has kidnapped her, but Haines sees a ticker report about the watch found at the crime scene, and they join forces with the Feds in Kentucky. Haines inquires among local associates of his underworld acquaintances back east, but they know nothing.

In the cave, Mary takes to playing music on her car's console radio. Under cover of this, she uses the pack radio stolen from Haines to call for help. Her call interferes with the broadcast of the Kentucky Derby, and is overheard by Haines in a bar. When she calls again, Federal agents locate her approximate position by radio direction finding.

Feds and state police surround the area, while Tiny cruises overhead in the Goodyear blimp, listening for more calls from Mary. She gets off another call, and he hears and traces it.

Potter spots the pack radio, but Mary grabs it and locks herself in the armored truck, still broadcasting, leading Tiny to the track leading into the cave. The gang try to open the truck with a cutting torch, but the Feds arrive in time to save Mary. Haines embraces her, and puts her on the air to tell her story, but she tells the audience to read it in the Star.

Cast
 Lee Tracy as Eddie Haines
 Diana Gibson as Mary Bradley
 Donald Meek as Potter
 Paul Guilfoyle as Art Martin
 Philip Huston as Bennett
 Frank M. Thomas as Naylor
 Tom Kennedy as Tiny
 Doodles Weaver as Duggan
 Ralph Robertson as Announcer
 Art Thalasso as Bartender
 Edith Craig as Bennett's secretary

(Cast list as per AFI film database)

Reception
Harrison's Reports gave the film a mostly positive review. Although they felt the story was a bit "farfetched", they thought the film was well-paced, with plenty of excitement, and an appropriate amount of humor interspersed throughout. The Film Daily gave it a positive review, referring to it as an exciting thriller, and especially lauding the performance of Tracy, calling him "effervescent and dynamic". They also praised Gibson and Meek's performances, as well as Rosson's direction. Modern Screen gave it a less enthusiastic review, rating it at 2 out of 4 stars. They thought it was a run of the mill melodrama, only made worthwhile by the performances of Tracy and Gibson. They were also impressed with the acting of Meek, Hudson, Guilfoyle, and Kennedy. Motion Picture Daily was even less kind, calling the film's plot "far-fetched", and saying it was "just another film", good only as a second-feature. The Motion Picture Herald gave the film a very positive review, saying it "is fast-paced melodrama that never lets you down and builds to a most exciting climax." The Herald praised Tracy, and were particularly impressed with Gibson. They felt the weak point was casting Meek as the villain, although they felt he handled the role capably.

References

External links

RKO Pictures films
American drama films
1937 drama films
1937 films
American black-and-white films
Films about journalists
Films produced by Cliff Reid
Films directed by Richard Rosson
1930s American films